Yepifanov (masculine) or Yepifanova (feminine), also transliterated as Epifanov(a), is a Russian surname. Notable people with the surname include:

Aleksei Yepifanov (born 1983), Russian footballer
Alla Yepifanova (born 1976), Russian cyclist
Dmitri Yepifanov (born 1978), Russian footballer
Nikolay Yepifanov (born 1926), Soviet sailor
Olga Yepifanova (born 1966), Russian politician

See also

Russian-language surnames